The Old St. Wenceslaus Catholic Parish House is a house located in Tabor, South Dakota. It was constructed by immigrants from Bohemia in 1878. It was used as the residence of the pastor of St. Wenceslaus Church until 1910, when it was replaced by a new building.

The former rectory is the oldest brick structure in the city of Tabor. It was added to the National Register of Historic Places on February 8, 1988, as part of a "Thematic Nomination of Czech Folk Architecture of Southeastern South Dakota".

See also
National Register of Historic Places listings in Bon Homme County, South Dakota

References

External links

Old St. Wenceslaus Catholic Parish House, Tabor, SD

Buildings and structures in Tabor, South Dakota
Czech-American culture in South Dakota
Properties of religious function on the National Register of Historic Places in South Dakota
Roman Catholic Diocese of Sioux Falls
National Register of Historic Places in Bon Homme County, South Dakota
Houses on the National Register of Historic Places in South Dakota
Wenceslaus I, Duke of Bohemia